was a Japanese physician of the late Edo period, who served the Tsugaru clan of Hirosaki. He was the subject of a biography by Mori Ōgai, based on the Shibue family papers and serialised in 1916.

References
Edwin McClellan (1985). Woman in the Crested Kimono (New Haven: Yale University Press).

Samurai
1805 births
1858 deaths
19th-century Japanese physicians